Alfaro is a town and municipality in La Rioja, northern Spain.  Its population in January 2009 was 9,883 inhabitants, and its area is 194.23 km². It is known for the annual return and nesting of the 'Storks of Alfaro.'

During ancient Roman times, Alfaro was a municipium known as Graccuris; named after Tiberius Sempronius Gracchus.

Politics

Landmarks
Collegiate of San Miguel Arcángel, Alfaro 
Church of Nuestra Señora del Burgo
Plaza de Toros de Alfaro

Festivals
Festival dates in Alfaro:
 Storks Day - during the first weekend in February
 San Isidro—Spring Festival - May 15 
 San Roque—Summer Festival - August 14
 Holy Mary Burgo—September Festival - September 9

Gallery

References

External links 

 official Alfaro city website 

 All about the hispanic surname Alfaro

Municipalities in La Rioja (Spain)